Baghpura is a village in Ajmer tehsil of Ajmer district of Rajasthan state in India. The village falls under Aradka gram panchayat.

Demography 
As per 2011 census of India, Baghpura has population of 547 of which 280 are males and 267 are females. Sex ratio of the village is 954.

Transportation
Baghpura is connected by air (Kishangarh Airport), by train (Madar railway station) and by road.

See also
Ajmer Tehsil
Madar railway station

References

Villages in Ajmer district